Tok or TOK may refer to:

Tok, Alaska
Tok Pisin, a language
Toki Pona (ISO 639-3 code), a constructed language
T.O.K., a Jamaican reggae dancehall band
Theory of Knowledge (IB course)
 Tok, the Hungarian name for Toc village, Săvârșin Commune, Arad County, Romania
Tok, a type of kampilan sword from the Tboli people of Mindanao, Philippines
Paper Mario: The Origami King, a 2020 action adventure video game

People
 Barış Tok (born 1978), Turkish motorcycle racer